Francisco de Assis Avelino (born 15 February 1966) is a retired Brazilian Paralympic swimmer who competed at international elite competitions. He is a three-time Parapan American Games champion and a Paralympic champion.

References

1966 births
Living people
People from Natal, Rio Grande do Norte
Paralympic swimmers of Brazil
Swimmers at the 2000 Summer Paralympics
Swimmers at the 2004 Summer Paralympics
Swimmers at the 2008 Summer Paralympics
Swimmers at the 2012 Summer Paralympics
Medalists at the 2000 Summer Paralympics
Medalists at the 2004 Summer Paralympics
Medalists at the 2008 Summer Paralympics
Medalists at the 2003 Parapan American Games
Medalists at the 2007 Parapan American Games
Medalists at the 2011 Parapan American Games
Medalists at the 2015 Parapan American Games
People with polio
Brazilian male breaststroke swimmers
Brazilian male backstroke swimmers
Brazilian male freestyle swimmers
S5-classified Paralympic swimmers
Sportspeople from Rio Grande do Norte
21st-century Brazilian people
20th-century Brazilian people